The enzyme Pimelyl-[acyl-carrier protein] methyl ester esterase (EC 3.1.1.85, BioH; systematic name pimelyl-[acyl-carrier protein] methyl ester hydrolase catalyses the reaction  

 pimelyl-[acyl-carrier protein] methyl ester + H2O  pimelyl-[acyl-carrier protein] + methanol

This enzyme takes part in biotin biosynthesis in Gram-negative bacteria.

References

External links 
 

EC 3.1.1